Paul Hollingsworth  is a Canadian sports reporter and author based out of Nova Scotia, currently working as the Atlantic Canada Bureau Reporter for TSN's flagship sports news program, SportsCentre. He is also a sports/general assignment reporter and weekend anchor for CTV Atlantic.

Education 

Hollingsworth was born in Dartmouth, Nova Scotia. He graduated from Saint Mary's University with a Bachelor of Arts in English, as well as a Bachelor of Journalism from the University of King's College.

Career 

Hollingsworth began his broadcasting career with CTV in 1995, where he is now the weekend news anchor at CTV Atlantic.

Hollingsworth joined TSN in November 2001. During his time at the network, in addition to his work as SportsCentre's Atlantic correspondent, Hollingsworth has reported from the World Series, World Baseball Classic, Super Bowl, 2006 FIFA World Cup, Stanley Cup Playoffs, Tim Hortons Brier, and IIHF World Junior Championship.

Publications 

In 2006, Hollingsworth co-authored the book, All Sorts of Sports Trivia and in October 2007, he released his biography of NHL forward Brad Richards which was a best-seller. In November 2010, his third book, Sidney Crosby, The Story of a Champion, was released. It was a top selling soft cover, non-fiction book in Canada upon its release. In October 2015, his fourth book Nathan MacKinnon, The NHL's Rising Star was released.

References

External links
 TSN Bio of Paul Hollingsworth

Canadian people of English descent
Canadian television reporters and correspondents
Canadian television sportscasters
Living people
People from Dartmouth, Nova Scotia
Saint Mary's University (Halifax) alumni
1969 births